Trinity Center is a census-designated place (CDP) in Trinity County, California. It is home to Trinity Lake, a popular summer tourist destination. It is home to a store, Trinity Center Airport, a marina, a community church, several campgrounds, and several small resorts.

Coffee Creek is close by. The ZIP code is 96091. Its population is 198 as of the 2020 census, down from 267 from the 2010 census.

History
The original town of Trinity Center was established in 1851 as a stage stop for travelers headed further north and now lies beneath the lake, which came into existence after the construction of the Trinity River Dam in 1961. A handful of buildings were moved to the town's present day location, including the I.O.O.F. building and several residences. Trinity Center was a gold mining town, shown by the mine tailings left at the north end of the lake.

Geography
According to the United States Census Bureau, the CDP covers an area of 5.2 square miles (13.5 km), all of it land.

Demographics
The 2010 United States Census reported that Trinity Center had a population of 267. The racial makeup of Trinity Center was 249 (93.3%) White, 0 (0.0%) African American, 7 (2.6%) Native American, 1 (0.4%) Asian, 3 (1.1%) Pacific Islander, 2 (0.7%) from other races, and 5 (1.9%) from two or more races. Hispanic or Latino of any race were 11 persons (4.1%).

The Census reported that 267 people (100% of the population) lived in households, 0 (0%) lived in non-institutionalized group quarters, and 0 (0%) were institutionalized.

There were 137 households, out of which 15 (10.9%) had children under the age of 18 living in them, 80 (58.4%) were opposite-sex married couples living together, 5 (3.6%) had a female householder with no husband present, 5 (3.6%) had a male householder with no wife present.  There were 12 (8.8%) unmarried opposite-sex partnerships, and 3 (2.2%) same-sex married couples or partnerships. 37 households (27.0%) were made up of individuals, and 21 (15.3%) had someone living alone who was 65 years of age or older. The average household size was 1.95.  There were 90 families (65.7% of all households); the average family size was 2.26.

The population was spread out, with 24 people (9.0%) under the age of 18, 7 people (2.6%) aged 18 to 24, 29 people (10.9%) aged 25 to 44, 98 people (36.7%) aged 45 to 64, and 109 people (40.8%) who were 65 years of age or older.  The median age was 62.0 years. For every 100 females, there were 97.8 males.  For every 100 females age 18 and over, there were 94.4 males.

The homeowner vacancy rate was 8.9%; the rental vacancy rate was 0%.  202 people (75.7% of the population) lived in owner-occupied housing units and 65 people (24.3%) lived in rental housing units.

Politics

See also
Trinity County, California

References

External links
Trinity Center and North Trinity Lake

Census-designated places in Trinity County, California
Census-designated places in California
Populated places established in 1851
1851 establishments in California